Masalit (autonym Masala/Masara) is a language  spoken by the Masalit people in western Darfur, Sudan.

Masalit, known as the Massalat moved west into central-eastern Chad.

Phonology

Vowels

Consonants 

 It has been stated that occasional click sounds [ǀ] and [ǃ] may occur, however; they are considered to be rare.
 Sounds /r, l, m, k/ can occur as geminated [rː, lː, mː, kː].
 Sounds /t, m, n, ŋ/ can occur as palatalized [tʲ, mʲ, nʲ, ŋʲ] before front vowels.
 /z, x/ only occur as a result of words of Arabic origin.
 [ʔ] is not a phonemic sound, and is only heard before word-initial vowels.
 Sounds /p, ɥ, v/ only occur in word-initial position.

Sociolects
The Masalit language has two sociolects:
"Heavy" Masalit, spoken by higher-ranking people and those in the countryside, with a complicated agglutinative grammar
"Light" Masalit, spoken particularly in the home and in the market, with a somewhat simplified grammatical structure and many borrowings from Sudanese Arabic, the regional lingua franca and language of education.

References

External links

The Lost Languages, Found in New York - NYTimes.com

Further reading

Edgar, J. (1990). Masalit stories. African Languages and Cultures, 3(2), 127-148.
Jakobi, A. (1991). Au Masali Grammar: With Notes on Other Languages of Darfur and Wadai. Anthropos, 86(4-6), 599-601.

Agglutinative languages
Maban languages
Languages of Sudan
Languages of Chad